is a Japanese politician of the Democratic Party of Japan, who served two terms in the House of Councillors in the National Diet, representing the Hyogo at-large district. A native of Kobe, Hyogo, he graduated from the University of Tokyo and studied at the Johns Hopkins University. He was elected to the House of Councillors for the first time in 2001 after making three unsuccessful runs for the House of Representatives in 1986, 1990 and 2000. He sought a third term at the July 2013 election but was defeated by Japan Restoration Party candidate Takayuki Shimizu.

References

Sources

External links 
  

Members of the House of Councillors (Japan)
University of Tokyo alumni
Living people
1955 births
People from Kobe
Democratic Party of Japan politicians